Mactra glauca is a species of saltwater clam, a marine bivalve mollusc in the family Mactridae, the trough shells.

Appearance

Mactra glauca has a broadly triangular, thin, glossy shell up to 115mm in length. The shell is creamy white with radiating pale brown rays, a brown periostracum and a pale brown interior.

The difference between M. glauca and M. stultorum is that the anterior cardinal tooth of the right valve is not parallel with the hinge line in M. glauca, whereas in M. stultorum it is.

Distribution

Mactra glauca is found on the continental shelf, from the south of England to the Mediterranean and West Africa. It is also found as fossils in the North Sea from the Eemian period.

Ecology

Mactra glauca is a suspension feeder which feeds on phytoplankton. It burrows into clean sand, going down up to 7 cm if exposed by the tide.

References

External links

Mactridae
Bivalves described in 1778